Rudolf Weyr, from 14 May 1911, Rudolf Ritter von Weyr  (22 March 1847, Vienna - 30 October 1914, Vienna) was an Austrian sculptor in the Neo-Baroque style.

Life
He studied under Franz Bauer and Josef Cesar and was employed by the latter for many years. In 1875, he was contracted by Gottfried Semper and Carl Hasenauer to assist them with their work on the Kunsthistorisches Museum. In 1879, under the direction of Hans Makart, he designed table settings and other decorative pieces for the Emperor's Silver Wedding Anniversary. From the late 1880s, he worked alone and created some of the most important figures that adorn the Ringstraße.

In his later years, Weyr suffered from arteriosclerosis and died of heart failure induced by pneumonia. He was buried in the Döbling Cemetery.

In 1919, a street in Landstraße was named the Weyrgasse in his honor.

Major works 
 1884: Gable statues at the Hermesvilla
 1888: Spandrel figures in the windows at the Burgtheater
 1889: Grillparzer Memorial in the Burggarten (with Carl Kundmann); Weyr created the reliefs depicting Grillparzer's dramatic works.
 1890: Relief figures of the Museum's patrons in the dome of the Kunsthistorischen Museum
 1895: Fountain: "Die Macht zur See" at the Michaelertrakt in the Hofburg
 1895: Relief of Vasil Levski on his Memorial Sofia, Bulgaria
 1898: Emperor Franz-Josef Memorial in Schwechat 
 1905: Memorial to Hans Canon in the Stadtpark
 1907: Fountain in Děčín, Czech Republic
 1908: Memorial to Johannes Brahms in the Karlsplatz

References

External links 

 
 

1847 births
1914 deaths
Austrian sculptors
Austrian male sculptors
Artists from Vienna
20th-century sculptors
19th-century sculptors
Burials at Döbling Cemetery